Thillu Mullu is a 1981 Indian Tamil-language comedy film directed by K. Balachander.

Thillu Mullu may also refer to:

 Thillu Mullu (2013 film), a remake of the 1981 film
 Thillu Mullu, working title of Mirattal, a 2012 action comedy film